Andrew Spencer Mavis (born September 9, 1976, in Vancouver, British Columbia) is a Canadian basketball player.

Mavis played high school basketball at Richmond Secondary School, where he led the team to a second-place finish at the British Columbia AAA Tournament in his senior year.

He played college basketball for the Northern Arizona Lumberjacks, a member of the NCAA Division I's Big Sky Conference. At the end 1997–98 season Mavis was named the Big Sky Conference Player of the Year.

Mavis played for Canada at the 2000 Summer Olympics on a team that also featured future NBA Most Valuable Player Steve Nash.

External links

1976 births
Living people
Basketball people from British Columbia
Basketball players at the 1999 Pan American Games
Basketball players at the 2000 Summer Olympics
Canadian men's basketball players
Canadian expatriate sportspeople in England
Canadian expatriate basketball people in the United States
Cheshire Jets players
Newcastle Eagles players
Northern Arizona Lumberjacks men's basketball players
Olympic basketball players of Canada
Pan American Games competitors for Canada
Basketball players from Vancouver